Infiniment (Infinitely) is a 2-CD compilation of Jacques Brel's best known songs. This compilation of remastered songs also contains 5 unpublished titles from the recording session of the album Les Marquises: "La cathédrale", "L'amour est mort", "Mai 40", "Avec élégance", and "Sans exigences". A booklet is included with the lyrics of the 5 new titles. Infiniment was released on 30 September 2003 to mark the 25th anniversary of Brel's death.

Track listing

CD 1

 "La quête"
 "La cathédrale"
 "L'amour est mort"
 "Mai 40"
 "Avec élégance"
 "Sans exigences"
 "Les Marquises"
 "Orly"
 "La ville s'endormait"
 "Jojo"
 "J'arrive"
 "Quand on n'a que l'amour"
 "Le Plat Pays"
 "Mon enfance"
 "Les vieux"
 "La chanson de Jacky"
 "La valse à mille temps"
 "Le prochain amour"
 "La chanson des vieux amants"
 "Ne me quitte pas"

CD 2

 "Amsterdam"
 "La bière"
 "Bruxelles"
 "Le diable 'ça va'"
 "Il nous faut regarder"
 "L'enfance"
 "Ces gens-là"
 "Les bonbons"
 "Les flamandes"
 "Les bourgeois"
 "Jef"
 "Mathilde"
 "Marieke"
 "Madeleine"
 "Les bigotes"
 "Vesoul"
 "Le Moribond"
 "Au suivant"
 "Le dernier repas"
 "Je suis un soir d'été"

Charts

Weekly charts

Year-end charts

References

Jacques Brel albums
2003 compilation albums
French-language compilation albums
Universal Music Group compilation albums
Barclay (record label) compilation albums
Albums conducted by François Rauber
Albums conducted by Michel Legrand
Albums conducted by André Popp